Villa d'Este may be:

 Villa d'Este, a 16th-century villa in Tivoli, near Rome, Italy
 Villa d'Este (Cernobbio), a Renaissance patrician residence in Cernobbio on the shores of Lake Como, northern Italy, now a deluxe hotel
 Villa d'Este (Johannesburg), a National Heritage site in Johannesburg, Gauteng, South Africa
 Berlin Villa d'Este, a former 1920s restaurant and dance cafe in the Charlottenburg district of Berlin, Germany

See also
 Palazzina Marfisa d'Este, a Renaissance-style palace, sometimes referred to as a villa, located east of Central Ferrara, Emilia-Romagna, Italy
 Concorso d'Eleganza Villa d'Este, an event for classic and vintage cars, held near the Villa d'Este, Cernobbio, northern Italy